George Thomas Dennis (12 September 1897–1969) was an English footballer who played in the Football League for Bristol Rovers, Luton Town, Norwich City and Nottingham Forest.

References

1897 births
1969 deaths
English footballers
Association football forwards
English Football League players
Gresley F.C. players
Nottingham Forest F.C. players
Luton Town F.C. players
Norwich City F.C. players
Bristol Rovers F.C. players
Burton Town F.C. players